Amy Pietz (born March 6, 1969) is an American actress, known for her roles on television. She received the Screen Actors Guild Award for Outstanding Performance by a Female Actor in a Comedy Series nomination for her role as Annie Spadaro in the NBC sitcom Caroline in the City (1995-1999). She later had starring roles in the short-lived sitcoms Cursed (NBC, 2000–01), Rodney (ABC, 2004–06), and Aliens in America (The CW, 2007–08).

Early life
Pietz was born in Milwaukee, Wisconsin, the adopted daughter of Nancy, a nurse, and Arnold Pietz, a truck driver. She trained throughout her childhood in ballet and prepared to go professional, but eventually decided against it due to the low pay and shifted her focus elsewhere.

She attended the Milwaukee High School of the Arts and graduated from The Theatre School at DePaul University.

Career
Pietz began her career playing small roles on television series such as Star Trek: The Next Generation, as well as films Rudy (1993) and Jingle All the Way (1996). In 1995, she was regular cast member on the short-lived The WB sitcom Muscle, before her breakthrough role as Annie Spadaro in the NBC sitcom Caroline in the City starring Lea Thompson. The series aired from 1995 to 1999. She was nominated for a Screen Actors Guild Award for Outstanding Performance by a Female Actor in a Comedy Series for the role in 1999.

The following year, Pietz went to star alongside Steven Weber on the NBC sitcom Cursed. The series was canceled after a single season in 2001. She later played Martha Boswell in the stage musical The Boswell Sisters.

From 2004 to 2006, she appeared in ABC sitcom Rodney. During 2007–08 season, she played the mother in The CW sitcom Aliens in America. She also had guest starring roles on Ally McBeal, CSI: Crime Scene Investigation, The Division, Law & Order: Special Victims Unit, Burn Notice, The Closer, Curb Your Enthusiasm, Nip/Tuck, Desperate Housewives, Two and a Half Men, Mom, and How to Get Away with Murder. She had a recurring role as Donna in the NBC comedy series The Office in 2010.

In 2011, Pietz played Meredith King, the mother of Chloe King, in the short-lived ABC Family drama series The Nine Lives of Chloe King. In 2016, she was cast as lead character's boss in The CW comedy-drama series No Tomorrow.

In 2016, Pietz guest-starred in the 4th season of Marc Maron's IFC series Maron as Natalie, a fellow rehab patient. In 2019, she starred as Ralph Dibny's mother in The Flash.

Personal life
Pietz married actor Kenneth Alan Williams in 1997 in her native Milwaukee. Pietz gave birth to a son when she was 23, Benjamin, whom she subsequently placed for adoption.

Filmography

Film

Television

References

External links

1969 births
Actresses from Milwaukee
American adoptees
American film actresses
American television actresses
American voice actresses
DePaul University alumni
Living people
20th-century American actresses
21st-century American actresses
American people of German descent